The Aitcho Islands (‘Aitcho’ standing for ‘H.O.’ i.e. ‘Hydrographic Office’) are a group of minor islands on the west side of the north entrance to English Strait separating Greenwich Island and Robert Island in the South Shetland Islands, Antarctica, which are situated between Dee Island to the south and Table Island to the north.  The group is separated from Dee Island and Sierra Island to the southwest by Villalón Passage.   The area was visited by early 19th century sealers operating from nearby Clothier Harbour.  During the austral summer the islands are often visited by Antarctic cruise ships with tourists who land to watch wildlife.

The islands were mapped in 1935 during the oceanographic investigations carried out by the Discovery Committee, and named after the Hydrographic Office of the UK Admiralty.  Some of the island names were given by Chilean Antarctic expeditions between 1949 and 1951.

Islands

The islands and some notable rocks of the Aitcho group are:
 Barrientos Island
 Bilyana Island
 Cecilia Island, named Isla Torre by Chile
 Chaos Reef
 Cheshire Rock
 Emeline Island
 Jorge Island
 Kilifarevo Island
 Morris Rock
 Okol Rocks
 Pasarel Island
 Passage Rock
 Riksa Islands

Flora and fauna
Among the bird species found on the islands are chinstrap and gentoo penguins, southern giant petrels, and skuas. Southern elephant seals are among the larger life forms. Other seals in the region include the Antarctic fur seal and the Weddell seal. There are also a wide variety of lichens and mosses reported.

Regular wildlife surveys are conducted to assess the populations of birdlife on the islands.

See also
 Composite Antarctic Gazetteer
 Greenwich Island
 List of Antarctic islands south of 60° S
 Robert Island
 SCAR
 South Shetland Islands
 Territorial claims in Antarctica

Maps
 L.L. Ivanov et al., Antarctica: Livingston Island and Greenwich Island, South Shetland Islands (from English Strait to Morton Strait, with illustrations and ice-cover distribution), 1:100000 scale topographic map, Antarctic Place-names Commission of Bulgaria, Sofia, 2005
 L.L. Ivanov. Antarctica: Livingston Island and Greenwich, Robert, Snow and Smith Islands. Scale 1:120000 topographic map. Troyan: Manfred Wörner Foundation, 2010.  (First edition 2009. )

References

External links
 Images from Aitcho Island

Islands of the South Shetland Islands
Tourism sites in Antarctica